Ardrossan Town railway station is one of three remaining in the town of Ardrossan, North Ayrshire, Scotland. It is one of the oldest operational railway stations in Ayrshire, although services and facilities are severely cut back from the station's peak in the early 20th century. The station is currently managed by ScotRail and is on the Ayrshire Coast Line.

History 

The station was opened in 1831 by the Ardrossan Railway and was simply known as Ardrossan. The original station had two side platforms and although it was a terminus at first it became an intermediate station upon the opening of Ardrossan Pier railway station in 1840. The station was rebuilt some time around 1890,

It became part of the Glasgow and South Western Railway, passing to the London, Midland and Scottish Railway during the Grouping of 1923. The station then passed on to the Scottish Region of British Railways on nationalisation in 1948 and was renamed Ardrossan Town by British Rail on 2 March 1953.

The rebuilt station consisted of two through lines with the addition of a bay platform at the north end. A goods shed and yard were located to the west of the platforms. The main offices were located on the Up platform, consisting of a one and two storey ashlar building. The station was closed on 1 January 1968 and lay derelict for a number of years, though the double tracks into the bay platform remained and were used for stabling empty DMUs from time to time.

Upon electrification of the Ayrshire Coast Line, the station was reopened on 19 January 1987, now unstaffed and on a far smaller scale: the double track to the harbour was singled and the Up platform removed, meaning trains from both directions would now have to use the former Down platform. After electrification, the nearby level crossing gates remained for a number of years but have since been removed. The station buildings remained unused but were later refurbished for use as commercial properties and the branch lines into the bay platform at the station were lifted. In the early 2000s, the surviving station office buildings were demolished and replaced by a contemporary red-brick commercial unit. The goods shed remains as private property.

Services 

There was no Sunday service for many years, but in the May 2016 timetable a limited service is provided (5 arrivals & 4 departures) to connect with the ferry.

References

Notes

Sources 

 
 
 
 
 Station on navigable O.S. map. Main station (square symbol) in town.

External links

 Video footage of Ardrossan Town in 2016

Railway stations in North Ayrshire
Railway stations in Great Britain opened in 1831
Railway stations in Great Britain closed in 1968
Railway stations in Great Britain opened in 1987
Reopened railway stations in Great Britain
SPT railway stations
Railway stations served by ScotRail
Beeching closures in Scotland
Former Glasgow and South Western Railway stations
1831 establishments in Scotland
Ardrossan−Saltcoats−Stevenston